There are 39 sectors of Guinea-Bissau (singular: setor, plural: setores) which subdivide the regions. The sectors are further subdivided into smaller groups called sections (singular: secção, plural: secções); which are further subdivided into populated places (i.e.: towns, villages, localities, settlements, communities, etc.). Here are the following listed below, by region:

Eastern Guinea-Bissau

Bafata Region

 Bafata
 Bambadinca
 Contuboel
 Galomaro
 Gamamundo
 Xitole

Gabú Region

 Boe
 Gabú
 Piche
 Pirada
 Sonaco

Northern Guinea-Bissau

Biombo Region

 Prabis
 Quinhamel
 Safim

Cacheu Region

 Bigene
 Bula
 Cacheu
 Caio
 Canghungo
 São Domingos

Oio Region

 Bissorã
 Farim
 Mansaba
 Mansôa
 Nhacra

Bissau Region

 Bissau (autonomous sector)

Southern Guinea-Bissau

Bolama Region

 Bolama
 Bubaque
 Caravela
 Uno

Quinara Region

 Buba
 Empada
 Fulacunda
 Tite

Tombali Region

 Bedanda
 Cacine
 Catió
 Quebo
 Komo

 
Subdivisions of Guinea-Bissau
Guinea-Bissau, Sectors
Guinea-Bissau 2
Sectors, Guinea-Bissau
Guinea-Bissau geography-related lists